The integral of secant cubed is a frequent and challenging indefinite integral of elementary calculus:

where  is the inverse Gudermannian function, the integral of the secant function.

There are a number of reasons why this particular antiderivative is worthy of special attention:

 The technique used for reducing integrals of higher odd powers of secant to lower ones is fully present in this, the simplest case.  The other cases are done in the same way.
 The utility of hyperbolic functions in integration can be demonstrated in cases of odd powers of secant (powers of tangent can also be included).
 This is one of several integrals usually done in a first-year calculus course in which the most natural way to proceed involves integrating by parts and returning to the same integral one started with (another is the integral of the product of an exponential function with a sine or cosine function; yet another the integral of a power of the sine or cosine function).
 This integral is used in evaluating any integral of the form
 
 where  is a constant.  In particular, it appears in the problems of:

 rectifying the parabola and the Archimedean spiral
 finding the surface area of the helicoid.

Derivations

Integration by parts 

This antiderivative may be found by integration by parts, as follows:

where

Then

Next add  to both sides:

using the integral of the secant function, 

Finally, divide both sides by 2:

which was to be derived.

Reduction to an integral of a rational function 

where , so that . This admits a decomposition by partial fractions:

Antidifferentiating term-by-term, one gets

Hyperbolic functions 

Note that  follows directly from this substitution.

Higher odd powers of secant 

Just as the integration by parts above reduced the integral of secant cubed to the integral of secant to the first power, so a similar process reduces the integral of higher odd powers of secant to lower ones. This is the secant reduction formula, which follows the syntax:

Even powers of tangents can be accommodated by using binomial expansion to form an odd polynomial of secant and using these formulae on the largest term and combining like terms.

See also 

 Lists of integrals

Notes

References

Integral calculus